Adam Končić (born 5 July 1968) is a Croatian singer and actor. A former member of the quartet , he has starred in both films and TV series.

Biography
Končić was born in Zabok, in the Zagorje.

In 2021 he was part of a band that sang for the earthquake-stricken Sisak-Moslavina County.

Končić is married to wife Nina and has three children. He reportedly is a supporter of right-wing party HDZ.

Filmography

Television roles
 Tito (2010)
  as Zdeslav (2010)
 Zakon! as Nelson (2009)
  as Krešimir "Krešo" Kovač (2005-2006)

Film roles
  (2009)
 What Iva Recorded as waiter (2005)
 Long Dark Night (2004)
  as chaplain (2003)
 Četverored as second investigator (1999)
  (1998)

Voice roles
 Jura bježi od kuće as Zig and Zag (2007)

References

External links

Web page at Komedija.hr 

1977 births
Living people
21st-century Croatian male singers
Croatian pop singers
People from Zabok